Aranyaka (A Trip Into the Jungle) is a 1994 Indian Hindi drama film directed by Apurba Kishore Bir. The film stars Sarat Pujari, Navni Parihar, Sanjana Kapoor and Mohan Gokhale in lead roles. Based on a short story Aranyaka by eminent writer Padma Bhushan Manoj Das, the film is set in rural Odisha, where a formal local ruler organizes a hunt for his invited guests, which goes wrong. The film highlights the clash between ruling class and indigenous people of the region.

Cast
 Sarat Pujari as Raja Saheb
 Mohan Gokhale as Mr. Mitty
 Lalatendu Rath as Major
 Sanjana Kapoor as Elina
 Navni Parihar as Mrs. Mitty
 Sunil Sing as Shyamal
 Subrata Mahapatra as Chowkidar
 Jangyaseni Jena as Tribal girl
 Ajay Nath as Tribal boy
 Pritikrushna Mahanty as Tribal boy
 Ashim Basu as Mad beggar

References

External links
 

1994 films
1990s psychological drama films
Films based on short fiction
Indian psychological drama films
1990s Hindi-language films
Films directed by Apurba Kishore Bir